Mena is a city in Koriukivka Raion, Chernihiv Oblast (province) of Ukraine. It hosts the administration of Mena urban hromada, one of the hromadas of Ukraine. Population: 

Until 18 July 2020, Mena was the administrative center of Mena Raion. The raion was abolished in July 2020 as part of the administrative reform of Ukraine, which reduced the number of raions of Chernihiv Oblast to five. The area of Mena Raion was split between Chernihiv and Koriukivka Raions, with Mena being transferred to Chernihiv Raion.

Gallery

References

External links
 The murder of the Jews of Mena during World War II, at Yad Vashem website.

Cities in Chernihiv Oblast
Cities of district significance in Ukraine
Sosnitsky Uyezd
Holocaust locations in Ukraine